Çıpçıq is a rural locality (a selo) in Biektaw District, Tatarstan. The population was 1677 as of 2010.

Çıpçıq is located 18 km northeast of Biektaw, district's administrative centre, and 32 km northeast of Qazan, republic's capital, by road.

The earliest known record of the settlement dates from the 16th century. It forms part of the district since 1965.

There are 11 streets in the village.

References

External links 
 

Rural localities in Vysokogorsky District